Throughout the history of the Soviet Union, tens of millions of people suffered political repression, which was an instrument of the state since the October Revolution. It culminated during the Stalin era, then declined, but it continued to exist during the "Khrushchev Thaw", followed by increased persecution of Soviet dissidents during the Brezhnev era, and it did not cease to exist until late in Mikhail Gorbachev's rule when it was ended in keeping with his policies of glasnost and perestroika.

Origins and early Soviet times

Secret police had a long history in Tsarist Russia. Ivan the Terrible used the Oprichina, while more recently the Third Section and Okrhana existed.

Early on, the Leninist view of the class conflict and the resulting notion of the dictatorship of the proletariat provided the theoretical basis of the repressions. Its legal basis was formalized into the Article 58 in the code of Russian SFSR and similar articles for other Soviet republics.

At times, the repressed were called the enemies of the people. Punishments by the state included summary executions, sending innocent people to Gulag, forced resettlement, and stripping of citizen's rights. Repression was conducted by the Cheka and its successors, and other state organs. Periods of the increased repression include Red Terror, Collectivisation, the Great Purges, the Doctor's Plot, and others. The secret police forces conducted massacres of prisoners on numerous occasions. Repression took place in the Soviet republics and in the territories occupied by the Soviet Army during World War II, including the Baltic States and Eastern Europe.

State repression led to incidents of resistance, such as the Tambov rebellion (1920–1921), the Kronstadt rebellion (1921), and the Vorkuta Uprising (1953); the Soviet authorities suppressed such resistance with overwhelming military force. During the Tambov rebellion Mikhail Tukhachevsky (chief Red Army commander in the area), allegedly authorized Bolshevik military forces to use chemical weapons against villages with civilian population and rebels (according to witnesses' accounts, chemical weapons were never actually used). Prominent citizens of villages were often taken as hostages and executed if the resistance fighters did not surrender.

Red Terror

Arising after assassination attempts on Vladimir Lenin and Petrograd Cheka leader Moisei Uritsky, the latter of which was successful, the Red Terror was modeled on the Reign of Terror of the French Revolution, and sought to eliminate political dissent, opposition, and any other threat to Bolshevik power. More broadly, the term is usually applied to Bolshevik political repression throughout the Civil War (1917–1922), as distinguished from the White Terror carried out by the White Army (Russian and non-Russian groups opposed to Bolshevik rule) against their political enemies, including the Bolsheviks.

Estimates of the total number of victims of Bolshevik repression vary widely in both numbers and scope. One source estimates that from all causes, the total number of victims of repression and pacification campaigns is 1.3 million, whereas another gives estimates of 28,000 executions per year from December 1917 to February 1922. Estimates for the number of people shot during the initial period of the Red Terror are at least 10,000. Estimates for the whole period go for a low of 50,000 to highs of 140,000 and 200,000 executed. The most reliable estimations for the number of executions in total put the number at about 100,000.

Collectivization

Collectivization in the Soviet Union was a policy, pursued between 1928 and 1933, to consolidate individual land and labour into collective farms (kolkhoz, plural kolkhozy).  The Soviet leaders were confident that the replacement of individual peasant farms by kolkhozy would immediately increase food supplies for the urban population, the supply of raw materials for processing industry, and agricultural exports generally. Collectivization was thus regarded as the solution to the crisis in agricultural distribution (mainly in grain deliveries) that had developed since 1927 and was becoming more acute as the Soviet Union pressed ahead with its ambitious industrialization program. As the peasantry, with the exception of the poorest part, resisted the collectivization policy, the Soviet government resorted to harsh measures to force the farmers to collectivize. In his conversation with Winston Churchill Stalin gave his estimate of the number of "kulaks" who were repressed for resisting Soviet collectivization as 10 million, including those forcibly deported. Recent historians have estimated the death toll in the range of six to 13 million.

Great Purge

The Great Purge (transliterated Bolshaya chistka) was a series of campaigns of political repression and persecution in the Soviet Union orchestrated by Joseph Stalin in 1937–1938. It involved the purge of the Communist Party of the Soviet Union, repression of peasants, deportations of ethnic minorities, and the persecution of unaffiliated persons, characterized by widespread police surveillance, widespread suspicion of "saboteurs", imprisonment, and killings. Estimates of the number of deaths associated with the Great Purge run from the official figure of 681,692 to nearly 1 million.

Population transfers

Population transfer in the Soviet Union may be divided into the following broad categories: deportations of "anti-Soviet" categories within the population, who were often classified as "enemies of the workers"; deportations of nationalities; labor force transfer; and organised migrations in opposite directions in order to fill the ethnically cleansed territories. In most cases their destinations were underpopulated and remote areas (see Involuntary settlements in the Soviet Union).

Entire nations and ethnic groups were collectively punished by the Soviet Government for their alleged collaboration with the enemy during World War II. At least nine distinct ethnic-linguistic groups, including ethnic Germans, ethnic Greeks, ethnic Poles, Crimean Tatars, Balkars, Chechens, and Kalmyks, were deported to remote and unpopulated areas of Siberia (see sybirak) and Kazakhstan. Koreans and Romanians were also deported. Mass operations of the NKVD were needed to deport hundreds of thousands of people.

Gulag

The Gulag "was the branch of the State Security that operated the penal system of forced labour camps and associated detention and transit camps and prisons. While these camps housed criminals of all types, the Gulag system has become primarily known as a place for political prisoners and as a mechanism for repressing political opposition to the Soviet state."

Repressions in annexed territories
During the early years of World War II, the Soviet Union annexed several territories in Eastern Europe as a consequence of the German–Soviet Pact and its Secret Additional Protocol.

Baltic States

In the Baltic countries of Estonia, Latvia and Lithuania, repressions and mass deportations were carried out by the Soviets. The Serov Instructions, "On the Procedure for carrying out the Deportation of Anti-Soviet Elements from Lithuania, Latvia, and Estonia", contained detailed procedures and protocols to observe in the deportation of Baltic nationals. Public tribunals were also set up to punish "traitors to the people": those who had fallen short of the "political duty" of voting their countries into the USSR. In the first year of Soviet occupation, from June 1940 to June 1941, the number confirmed executed, conscripted, or deported is estimated at a minimum of 124,467: 59,732 in Estonia, 34,250 in Latvia, and 30,485 in Lithuania. This included 8 former heads of state and 38 ministers from Estonia, 3 former heads of state and 15 ministers from Latvia, and the then president, 5 prime ministers and 24 other ministers from Lithuania.

Poland

Romania

Post-Stalin era (1953–1991)

After Stalin's death, the suppression of dissent was dramatically reduced and it also took new forms. The internal critics of the system were convicted of anti-Soviet agitation, anti-Soviet slander, or they were accused of being "social parasites". Other critics were accused of being mentally ill, they were accused of having sluggish schizophrenia and incarcerated in "psikhushkas", i.e. mental hospitals which were used as prisons by the Soviet authorities. A number of notable dissidents, including Aleksandr Solzhenitsyn, Vladimir Bukovsky, and Andrei Sakharov, were sent to internal or external exile.

Loss of life

Estimates of the number of deaths attributable to Joseph Stalin vary widely. Some scholars assert that record-keeping of the executions of political prisoners and ethnic minorities are neither reliable nor complete; others contend archival materials contain irrefutable data far superior to sources utilized prior to 1991, such as statements from emigres and other informants. Those historians working after the Soviet Union's dissolution have estimated victim totals ranging from approximately 3 million to nearly 9 million. Some scholars still assert that the death toll could be in the tens of millions.

Counting the losses 

In 2011, the historian Timothy D. Snyder, after assessing 20 years of historical research in Eastern European archives, asserts that Stalin deliberately killed about 6 million (rising to 9 million if foreseeable deaths arising from policies are taken into account).

The release of previously secret reports from the Soviet archives in the 1990s indicate that the victims of repression in the Stalin era were about 9 million persons. Some historians claim that the death toll was around 20 million based on their own demographic analysis and from dated information published before the release of the reports from the Soviet archives. American historian Richard Pipes noted: "Censuses revealed that between 1932 and 1939—that is, after collectivization but before World War II—the population decreased by 9 to 10 million people. In his most recent edition of The Great Terror (2007), Robert Conquest states that while exact numbers may never be known with complete certainty, at least 15 million people were killed "by the whole range of Soviet regime's terrors". Rudolph Rummel in 2006 said that the earlier higher victim total estimates are correct, although he includes those killed by the government of the Soviet Union in other Eastern European countries as well. Conversely, J. Arch Getty, Stephen G. Wheatcroft and others insist that the opening of the Soviet archives has vindicated the lower estimates put forth by "revisionist" scholars. Simon Sebag Montefiore in 2003 suggested that Stalin was ultimately responsible for the deaths of at least 20 million people.

Some of these estimates rely in part on demographic losses. Conquest explained how he arrived at his estimate: "I suggest about eleven million by the beginning of 1937, and about three million over the period 1937–38, making fourteen million. The eleven-odd million is readily deduced from the undisputed population deficit shown in the suppressed census of January 1937, of fifteen to sixteen million, by making reasonable assumptions about how this was divided between birth deficit and deaths."

Some historians also believe that the official archival figures of the categories that were recorded by Soviet authorities are unreliable and incomplete. In addition to failures regarding comprehensive recordings, as one additional example, Canadian historian Robert Gellately and British historian Simon Sebag Montefiore argue that the many suspects beaten and tortured to death while in "investigative custody" were likely not to have been counted amongst the executed.Conversely, Australian historian Stephen G. Wheatcroft asserts that prior to the opening of the archives for historical research, "our understanding of the scale and the nature of Soviet repression has been extremely poor" and that some specialists who wish to maintain earlier high estimates of the Stalinist death toll are "finding it difficult to adapt to the new circumstances when the archives are open and when there are plenty of irrefutable data" and instead "hang on to their old Sovietological methods with round-about calculations based on odd statements from emigres and other informants who are supposed to have superior knowledge".

Remembering the victims 

A Day of Remembrance for the Victims of Political Repression (День памяти жертв политических репрессий) has been officially held on 30 October in Russia since 1991. It is also marked in other former Soviet republics with the exception of Ukraine, which has its own annual Day of Remembrance for the victims of political repressions by the Soviet regime, held each year on the third Sunday of May.

Members of the Memorial society have taken an active part in such commemorative meetings. Since 2007 Memorial has also organised the day-long "Restoring the Names" ceremony at the Solovetsky Stone in Moscow every 29 October.

The Wall of Grief in Moscow, inaugurated in October 2017, is Russia's first monument ordered by presidential decree for people killed during the Stalinist repressions in the Soviet Union.

See also
Active measures
 Crimes against humanity under communist regimes
Criticism of communist party rule
Goli Otok
Hitler Youth conspiracy
Human rights in the Soviet Union
Mass killings under communist regimes
Persecution of Christians in the Soviet Union
Persecution of Christians in the Eastern Bloc
Political abuse of psychiatry in the Soviet Union
Rehabilitation (Soviet)
Law of the Soviet Union
Politics of the Soviet Union
Soviet repressions in Belarus
The Black Book of Communism
 USSR anti-religious campaign (1917–1921)
 USSR anti-religious campaign (1921–1928)
 USSR anti-religious campaign (1928–1941)
 USSR anti-religious campaign (1958–1964)
 USSR anti-religious campaign (1970s–1987)

References

Notes

Bibliography

 
 
 
 
 "New directions in Gulag studies: a roundtable discussion," Canadian Slavonic Papers 59, no 3-4 (2017)
 
 
 
 Lynne Viola, "New sources on Soviet perpetrators of mass repression: a research note," Canadian Slavonic Papers 60, no 3-4 (2018)

Further reading

External link

 
Political and cultural purges
Persecution of dissidents in the Soviet Union
Commemoration of communist crimes